Newsfile is a Canadian documentary television series which aired on CBC Television in 1973.

Premise
This Toronto-produced series with host Lloyd Robertson featured documentary reports on various subjects including youth unemployment, planning for the 1976 Summer Olympics in Montreal, land claims by the First Nations in the Northwest Territories and a conference between federal and provincial governments.

Scheduling
This half-hour series was broadcast on alternate Thursdays at 10:30 p.m. (Eastern) from 15 February to 21 June 1973. Encounter was aired on other Thursdays.

References

External links
 

CBC Television original programming
1973 Canadian television series debuts
1973 Canadian television series endings